Rails-to-Trails Conservancy (RTC) is an American nonprofit organization based in Washington, D.C., that works with communities to preserve unused rail corridors by transforming them into rail trails within the United States. RTC's purpose is to create a nationwide network of trails from former rail lines and connecting corridors.

In addition to its headquarters in Washington, D.C., RTC has smaller offices in California, Florida, Pennsylvania and Ohio. RTC receives its funding largely from paid memberships and receives no government funding. As of December 2012, RTC had approximately 80,000 paid members, the remainder of its funding coming from foundation and corporate grants and major donors.

RTC members have developed programs focusing on urban rail trails and trail systems since 2009, including RTC's Urban Pathways Initiative (UPI), which features ongoing programs in Washington, D.C., Camden, New Jersey, Jacksonville, Florida, Compton, California, New Orleans, Louisiana, Springfield, Massachusetts, and Cleveland, Ohio, and is funded by The Kresge Foundation.

History
RTC was formed in 1986 by Peter Harnik and David Burwell. The Railroad Revitalization and Regulatory Reform Act of 1976 (known as the 4R Act) included a little-noticed section to provide funding, information exchange and technical assistance in order to preserve these corridors and create public trails. The "railbanking" provisions of this legislation allowed disused railroad corridors to be preserved in public ownership rather than sold and irrevocably dismantled. In addition to the creation of public railtrails, railbanking legislation has also enabled the reactivation of rail service along previously disused corridors.

In August 2000, RTC launched a trail-finder website with maps, photos, reviews and other information on U.S. rail trails, trails and greenways. Since 2000, RTC has used GPS mapping data to provide maps of more than 23,000 miles of trails. 

In 2007, RTC began recognizing rail trails with its Rail Trail Hall of Fame. The first inductees into the Rail Trail Hall of Fame were the Great Allegheny Passage, Pennsylvania, the Fred Marquis Pinellas Trail, Florida, and Katy Trail State Park, Missouri. In June, 2012, the Greenbrier River Trail, West Virginia, was the 26th trail to receive the designation.

See also
 Rails with trails

References

External links
 

Non-profit organizations based in Washington, D.C.